Overvecht is a green and spacious neighborhood in the Dutch town of Utrecht. It is one of the ten districts in which Utrecht is divided by government. Overvecht is a post-war high-rise district, as there are several in the Utrecht region (like Kanaleneiland, a district that has many architectural similarities, and Vollenhove in Zeist). The district is spacious and has a lot of greenery between the buildings. Overvecht offers many amenities: multiple parks, a large shopping mall, a police station, a library, train station and a neighborhood office. Also in sports and cultural areas, Overvecht offers many possibilities with its own swimming pool, the Kwakel, the Vechtsebanen skating rink, a large recreation area of the Ruijgenhoek and a cultural center of Stefanus. Overvecht is Utrecht's largest expansion district. The district has 33,732 inhabitants (2015, source: Gemeente Utrecht) and is therefore the fifth district in the city. The neighborhood offers housing to people of various cultural backgrounds.
On the edge of Overvecht are three forts that belong to the Hollandse Waterlinie: Fort de Gagel, Fort de Klop and Fort Blauwkapel. All forts are a national monument. This area also belongs to Overvecht. District Governor Jeroen Kreijkamp (D66) is District Alderman for Overvecht.

History 
The area belonging to the municipalities Maartensdijk, Achttienhoven and Westbroek came to Utrecht after the Municipal Reformation of 1954. Due to the border change, the construction of the Overvecht district was possible. The territory was 800 hectares. The urbanists Wissing and Hanekroot made the urban planning plan for Overvecht that was largely carried out in the sixties. Secondary Mayor of Utrecht, Coen de Ranitz, gave the official launch shot for the construction of the district on March 30, 1961. Between 1960 and 1970, Overvecht-Noord and Overvecht-Zuid were built. Many flats were built and relatively few single-family houses and the majority of the properties are owned by housing corporations. In the early years, Overvecht was a new construction area, which offered housing to housing seekers at the then tight housing market. The neighborhood has now grown into an adult multicultural district. Flats are interchanged with single-family homes. In addition to the rental houses, there are also more housing houses. In 2011, the district celebrated its 50th anniversary.
Work is currently underway (2012) with renovation of parts of the district and new construction projects such as Mariakwartier, Loevenhout, Bruisdreef and Wonen aan de Klop.

Suburbs and neighborhoods
The municipality divides the district into the following suburbs and neighborhoods:

Overvecht Zuid 
 Taag and Rubicondreef and surroundings
 Zamenhofdreef and surroundings
 Wolga and Donaudreef and surroundings
 Neckardreef and surroundings
 Polder Area Overvecht

Overvecht Noord 
 Zambesidreef and surroundings
 Tigris and Bostondreef and surroundings
 Business Area Nieuw Overvecht
 Amazone and Nicaraguadreef and surroundings

Street names 
All street names in Overvecht end in -dreef (drive). The major thoroughfares are named after famous scientists or scholars. The roads that form the crossroads between these roads are named after rivers. Some of the remaining streets have driven geographic or history names. Also in Overvecht Zuid, opera's, literature, names of Greek and Roman mythology, and a suburb with historical names of women.
In Overvecht Zuid (south of the Einsteindreef) street names have European names, in Overvecht Noord they have American names in the west side, Asian and Africans in the east side. Australia is not mentioned.

References

Districts in Utrecht (city)